Savvas is a Greek surname. Notable people with the surname include:

Alexander Savvas (1907–1981), Greek Professor of Medicine
Dimitrios Savvas (born 1939), Greek Olympic wrestler
Georgios Savvas ( 1880s–?), Greek revolutionary chieftain
Olivia Savvas, Australian politician

See also
 Savas (given name)
Sava (name)

Greek-language surnames